The 2015–16 Championnat de France Amateur is the 18th season of the fourth tier in the French football league system.

Teams
There were twelve teams promoted from Championnat de France amateur 2, while ten teams were relegated from the 2014–15 Championnat de France amateur. Two teams came from the 2014–15 Ligue 2 and 2014–15 Championnat National, which are AC Arles-Avignon and US Colomiers Football respectively. The original plan was to have CA Bastia, FC Istres and SAS Épinal also relegated from the Championnat National, but due to DNCG and/or FFF rulings, the following clubs were relegated to lower divisions: AC Arles-Avignon (demoted from Ligue 2), Vendée Poiré-sur-Vie Football (resigned to join CFA 2) and FC Istres (demoted to 6th level). Bastia and Épinal stayed in Championnat National.

Because of these vacancies, Hyères FC and Vendée Fontenay Foot remained in the CFA. Arles-Avignon was declared bankrupt in the middle of the season and subsequently relegated to the Mediterranean second tier or 7th tier overall. All results were invalidated and remaining games cancelled.

League tables

Season outcomes
Outcomes below are provisional and subject to ratification by the FFF.

Champions and promotion
Lyon-Duchère, Pau, Concarneau and Quevilly-Rouen are promoted to National.

Lyon-Duchère are Champions of 2015–16 Championnat de France amateur, due to having the best record of the four promoted sides against the teams finishing in 2nd to 6th in their respective groups.

Relegation
Troyes (res), Aubervilliers, Roye Noyon, Sochaux (res)
, Sarre-Union, Moulins , Bayonne, Rodez, Bordeaux (res), Stade Bordelais and Vitré were provisionally relegated to CFA2, subject to reprieves.

Reprieves
On 8 June, the FFF confirmed that Luçon would be administratively relegated from 2015–16 Championnat National to the regional Division d'Honneur. This results in a reprieve for Rodez.

On 31 May, the FFF confirmed that Colmar would be administratively relegated, in addition to their sporting relegation from 2015–16 Championnat National, resulting in Vitré being reprieved. Colmar subsequently filed for bankruptcy, and will reform in the regional Division d'Honneur.

If any further administrative events lead to teams from outside the relegation places being relegated, already relegated teams will be reprieved in the following order:

Best 14th placed teams
Based on record against the teams finishing in 9th to 13th place in their respective groups.

Best 15th placed teams
Based on record against the teams finishing in 10th to 14th place in their respective groups

Top scorers

References

External links 
 Official site
 Standings and statistics

 

2015-16
4
Fra